The name War of the Insurrection is used to refer to at least two wars commonly known by other names.

 The American Revolutionary War
 In the northern states of the US, an alternative term used in naming the American Civil War